Hasta que se ponga el sol (Spanish for "Until the sun sets") is 1973 Argentine documentary film of the foundational stage of the rock nacional (Spanish for "national rock") movement. It was filmed in the third edition of the historic B.A. Rock rock festival, which took place in 1972 at the Argentinos Juniors stadium. It was also completed with filming in Teatro Olimpia and the film studios of Argentina Sono Film and Phonalex. In addition to featuring live recordings of the main artists of Argentine rock of the time, it contains plot sequences interpreted by members of some of the groups that participated in the festival.

Artists
 Arco Iris
 Billy Bond y La Pesada
 Color Humano
 Claudio Gabis
 Gabriela
 León Gieco
 Litto Nebbia
 Orion's Beethoven
 Pappo
 Pescado Rabioso
 Sui Generis
 Vox Dei

See also
List of historic rock festivals
Piedra Roja
Psychedelic rock in Latin America

External links
Hasta que se ponga el sol on Cinenacional.com
 

1973 films
Argentine documentary films
1970s Spanish-language films
1970s Argentine films